Ananya is the common English spelling of two Indian given names: the masculine अनन्य  and the feminine अनन्या . The meaning of Ananya is 'unique'.

Notable people named Ananya 
 Ananya (actress) (born 1987), Indian actress
 Ananya Agarwal, Indian television child actress
 Ananya Bhat (born 1993), Indian playback singer
 Ananya Birla (born 1994), Indian singer, songwriter and entrepreneur
 Ananya Chatterjea, Indian dancer and scholar
 Ananya Chatterjee (born 1977), Indian actress
 Ananya Khare (born 1968), Indian actress
 Ananya Nagalla, Indian actress
 Ananya Nanda, Indian playback singer
 Ananya Panday (born 1998), Indian actress
 Ananya Roy (born 1970), American-Indian urban theorist

See also 
 Ananya Express, Indian Railways superfast-class train
 Anannya Magazine, a women's Bengali-language magazine
 Anannya Nattya Goshthi, a theatre group
 Lepiota ananya, a gilled mushroom found in Kerala, India
 Shree Airlines, Nepalese airline formerly known as Air Ananya

References 

Hindu given names
Indian feminine given names
Indian masculine given names